This is a list of e-Science infrastructures, that is, of computer systems created to support the computational demands of e-Science.

World Wide LHC Computing Grid
European Grid Infrastructure
Open Science Grid
Nordic Data Grid Facility

References

E-Science